Philip Arthur Shulman (born 27 August 1937, in The Gorbals, Glasgow, Scotland), is a Scottish musician who was a member of the progressive rock group Gentle Giant from 1970 to 1973 and performed on their albums Gentle Giant, Acquiring the Taste, Three Friends, and Octopus.

He is the eldest brother of Derek Shulman and Ray Shulman. All three were members of the sixties psychedelic group Simon Dupree and the Big Sound, and then formed the seminal progressive rock group Gentle Giant. A multi-instrumentalist, he has played alto and tenor saxophone, flute, clarinet, trumpet, cello, mellophone, piano, plus occasional percussion and vocals.

Previously he had played with Simon Dupree and the Big Sound.

References

1937 births
Living people
People from Gorbals
Scottish multi-instrumentalists
Jewish British musicians
Jewish rock musicians
Scottish Jews
Simon Dupree and the Big Sound members
Gentle Giant members